Tenyo Tenev Minchev (born 3 March 1954) is a Bulgarian former footballer who played as a midfielder.

Career
Tenyo Minchev started his career in Energetik Galabovo before moving to Beroe Stara Zagora in 1973. He became one of the key players and was team captain for 12 years. With Minchev's help, Beroe became champions in 1985–86 season.

After a short stint in Lokomotiv Stara Zagora, Tenyo Minchev moved to Soviet side Krylia Sovetov Kuybyshev. He became the first foreign player in Soviet football. After playing 28 matches for Krylia Sovetov, Minchev ended his career.

Minchev played 4 official and 3 unofficial matches for Bulgaria.

Honours
Bulgarian A PFG winner: 1985-86
Balkans Cup winner: 1983, 1984

References

External links
 Profile on FC Krylia Sovetov Samara official web-site 
 Career summary at KLISF 
 
 

1954 births
Living people
Bulgarian footballers
Bulgarian expatriate footballers
Bulgaria international footballers
PFC Beroe Stara Zagora players
PFC Krylia Sovetov Samara players
Expatriate footballers in the Soviet Union
First Professional Football League (Bulgaria) players
Soviet Second League players
Association football midfielders